M is a 2018 French Israeli documentary film directed by Yolande Zauberman. It follows Menachem Lang as he returns to Bnei Brak to confront the men who abused him as a child, to discuss child abuse with other members of the ultra-Orthodox community and to attempt to reconcile with his parents.

In 2020 it received the César Award for Best Documentary Film.

References

External links
 

2018 films
2018 documentary films
Israeli documentary films
Yiddish-language films